Sega Worldwide Soccer 97 (known as both Sega Worldwide Soccer PC and Victory Goal Worldwide Edition in Japan) is a football video game by Sega released for the Sega Saturn in 1996. It was followed by three more titles: Sega Worldwide Soccer '98 still on the Saturn and two editions of Sega Worldwide Soccer 2000, the second being Sega Worldwide Soccer 2000 Euro Edition for the Dreamcast.

Sega Worldwide Soccer 97, produced by Sega themselves, was one of the Saturn's killer apps in the peak of popularity for the console. It was the sequel to Victory Goal, one of the debut titles of the console, which had a poor performance critically and commercially. However, there was little overlap in the development staff of the two games.

The game featured international teams and league, play-off and tournament modes. Although it used fictional player names (due to the lack of a license), the non-volatile memory of the Saturn allowed editing of names. The team kits were as close to the official 1996 kits as possible. The gameplay was also highly praised, and was the top-rated football game until International Superstar Soccer 64 was released one year later. The game was ported to Microsoft Windows, with this version being released in Japan only on September 25, 1997.

Gameplay
In exhibition mode, the player(s) compete in a single match. In tournament mode, they go through an entire tournament, and in championship mode, they battle for the title of league champions.

The game includes a create-a-player feature.

Reception

The original Saturn release was met with critical acclaim. Tom Hall of GameSpot said it "may be the best soccer game ever released"; GamePro called it "a completely fresh, must-play gaming experience"; Rob Alsetter wrote in Sega Saturn Magazine that it was "perhaps the best soccer sim yet"; and Next Generations review concluded, "Quite simply, WWS '97 is the best recreation of any sport, ever." Common subjects of praise were the smoothness of the player animations, the easy-to-learn controls, the realistic soccer elements, and the way the game encourages players to be spontaneous and creative.

Though Electronic Gaming Monthly never reviewed the game, less than a year after its release they rated the Saturn version the 74th best console video game of all time, saying that it "set the standard for all other soccer games to follow. As such, it is considered to be the 'Madden' or 'NHL' of soccer." They cited the player animations, intelligent AI, realistic passing, and graphics.

References

External links

1996 video games
Association football video games
Sega video games
Sega Saturn games
Windows games
Video games set in 1996
Video games set in 1997
Video games scored by Jun Senoue
Video games developed in Japan